Sobradiel is a municipality located in the province of Zaragoza, Aragon, Spain. According to the 2004 census (INE), the municipality has a population of 752 inhabitants.

More information can be found in the official website www.sobradiel.es and in the unofficial community website www.sobradiel.org

References

Municipalities in the Province of Zaragoza